Brigadier General Michael Joseph Lenihan (May 2, 1865 – August 13, 1958) was a senior officer of the United States Army. He was involved in conflicts in the American Western Frontier, the Philippines, and World War I, where he commanded the 83rd Infantry Brigade during the Meuse-Argonne Offensive while serving on the Western Front.

Military career
Born the son of James Lenihan and Catherine Grainger, Michael Lenihan entered and later graduated from the United States Military Academy in June 1887. Among his fellow classmates included several general officers of the future, such as Charles Gerhardt, Ulysses G. McAlexander, Ernest Hinds, Nathaniel Fish McClure, William Weigel, Charles S. Farnsworth, James Theodore Dean, Mark L. Hersey, Herman Hall, Frank Herman Albright, Marcus Daniel Cronin, George Owen Squier, Thomas Grafton Hanson, George Washington Gatchell, Alexander Lucian Dade and Edmund Wittenmyer. He was appointed first lieutenant in 1894. He was made captain in 1899 and major in 1911. While stationed on the Hawaiian Islands, he was promoted to Lieutenant‑Colonel.

World War I

After the American entry into World War I, in April 1917, Lenihan received a temporary promotion to brigadier general (August 1917). He commanded the 83rd Infantry Brigade of the 42nd Division during the Meuse-Argonne Offensive. The 42nd division was commanded by Major General Charles T. Menoher.

When Lenihan’s 83rd Brigade and Douglas MacArthur’s neighboring 84th brigade failed to make progress against heavy German defences, Corps commander Charles P. Summerall threatened to relieve both generals. General William M. Wright describes in his memoirs that McArthur’s troops could approach Hill 288 and Châtillon-sous-les-Côtes using the forest as cover and took the objective, while Lenihan’s brigade was stopped by enemy resistance before they could take the objectives in the Landres-et-Saint-Georges area, sustaining heavy casualties. 
Summerall ordered General Menoher to relieve Lenihan, which he did on 17 October 1918. Lenihan protested and insisted on a hearing. The appointed inspector found no wrongdoing of Lenihan and Major General Hunter Liggett overrode Summerall’s decision and made Lenihan commander of the 153rd brigade of the 77th Infantry Division.

Post War

Lenihan returned to the rank of colonel after World War 1 in 1919. He was an instructor at the Naval War College, before he became Chief of Staff of the XII Army Corps in 1924. Lenihan was again promoted to brigadier general in 1925. He was awarded an LL.D. title by the College of the Holy Cross in 1925. In the last year of his active army service, he commanded the 3rd Infantry Division from March 1928 to March 1929.

Michael Lenihan died on August 13, 1958 at the age of 93 in Philadelphia. He was interred at Mount Olivet Cemetery in Washington, D.C.

References

External links

1865 births
1958 deaths
United States Army Infantry Branch personnel
United States Army generals of World War I
United States Military Academy alumni
United States Army generals
Naval War College alumni
People from Hopkinton, Massachusetts
Recipients of the Croix de Guerre (France)
Recipients of the Legion of Honour
United States Army War College alumni
Burials at Mount Olivet Cemetery (Washington, D.C.)
Naval War College faculty
Military personnel from Massachusetts